Tinthia  ruficollaris is a moth of the family Sesiidae. It is found in Papua New Guinea.

References

External links
sesiidae.net

Lepidoptera of Papua New Guinea
Sesiidae
Moths described in 1900